The 1999 Maui Invitational Tournament was an early-season college basketball tournament that was played, for the 16th time, from November 22 to November 24, 1999. The tournament, which began in 1984, was part of the 1999–00 NCAA Division I men's basketball season.  The tournament was played at the Lahaina Civic Center in Maui, Hawaii and was won by the North Carolina Tar Heels. It was the first title for both the program and for its head coach Bill Guthridge.

The field consisted of four teams which would make the 2000 NCAA tournament.

Bracket

References

Maui Invitational
Maui
Maui